David Aronson (October 28, 1923 – July 2, 2015) was a painter and Professor of Art at Boston University.

Biography
Aronson was born in  Šiluva, Lithuania in 1923 to an Orthodox Jewish family. His father was a rabbi. He taught at Boston University from 1955 to his death in 2015, where he formed the Fine Art Department. As an artist, he exhibited in Chicago, Philadelphia, New York, Los Angeles, Tokyo, Paris, Rome, Berlin and Copenhagen, among others. His work is represented in over forty museums.

Aronson's work is associated with the school of Boston Expressionism.

Aronson died at the age of 91 on July 2, 2015, from pneumonia and chronic heart failure.

Collections  
 Art Institute of Chicago
 DeCordova Museum and Sculpture Park, Lincoln, Mass.
 Israel Museum, Jerusalem
 Keene State College, Keene, N.H.
 Metropolitan Museum of Art, New York
 Museum of Fine Arts, Boston
 Museum of Modern Art, New York
 New Britain Museum of American Art, New Britain, Connecticut
 National Academy Museum and School, New York
 Smithsonian American Art Museum, Washington, D.C.
 University of New Hampshire Museum of Art, Durham

Awards  
 Guggenheim Fellowship  - List of Guggenheim Fellowships awarded in 1960
 Election as Academician at the National Academy of Design, New York in 1967
 Honorary Doctorate of Humane Letters from Hebrew College, Newton, Massachusetts.

Exhibitions
 David Aronson: The Paradox - Danforth Museum of Art

References

Images
 Silkscreen in MoMA Collection
 "Edmund Burke" bronze relief in the Smithsonian American Art Museum
 "Blind Samson" in the Smithsonian American Art Museum

1923 births
2015 deaths
20th-century American painters
American male painters
21st-century American painters
American people of Lithuanian-Jewish descent
Artists from Boston
School of the Museum of Fine Arts at Tufts alumni
Boston University faculty
Jewish American artists
Jewish painters
Soviet emigrants to the United States
National Academy of Design members
Deaths from pneumonia in Massachusetts
Boston expressionism
21st-century American Jews
20th-century American male artists